This list documents historical bridges located in New South Wales, Australia. Road, rail and pedestrian bridges are listed.
Generally bridges built before WWII (1939) have been included in this list.

Historical context
Bridge construction in New South Wales starts with the needs of the first settlers and continues through to the present day with advanced bridge design. The infant colony had limited expertise and limited materials. As time passed, techniques and materials were developed that allowed greater spans to be crossed and therefore expansion of the colony into otherwise inaccessible areas.

The NSW Public Works Department was under pressure from a cash strapped government to produce as much road and bridge work for as little cost as possible. The cheapest bridge was the timber truss which could be built with local timber.

All bridges are unique in the sense that the bridges were built using various technology, expertise, or materials or how they gained access to an area.

For example, at the time of early settlement, (1788 onwards) NSW was very isolated from the technological advances being developed in Europe and North America. Materials such as cast iron were unavailable to early colonial NSW bridge builders. NSW bridge builders had to rely on their own resourcefulness, bred of isolation, distance and the unique environment to make these bridges.

New South Wales's unusual environment, in general, results in unusual, and extreme river flows. This resulted in almost no water flow for most of the year with some flow each year and extreme floods around once a decade. Inland, the environment causes a low pressure system coming over the continent, due to a large high pressure of the Indian Ocean. This often occurs at summer, at which time it causes cyclone season, although it can occur at any time of year (but not inducing cyclones). At the coast, the cause is the "east coast low", which occurs at similar places at  the eastern edge of a number continents, and sees the continent's  normal high pressure  systems becomes  one large and stationary system, perhaps due to doldrums over the west coast's ocean.    This phenomenon causes the global trade winds deviate, - inducing the  low pressures  at polar and tropical latitudes to connect along the east coast - producing a trough situation that mimics a tropical monsoon. An east coast low rain event can occur at any time of the year.  Early settlers often  replaced washed out bridges with a similarly rudimentary structure, only to see it also washed away in a heavy rain event.  The government came to see that this was a major problem holding back economic development in New South Wales.

In solving these problems, colonial NSW embraced the innovations produced by others and adapted them successfully to the unique situations presented. There are examples of some fine 19th-century bridge engineering provided for the railway expansion, conceived mainly by British engineers working in the then isolation of the Australian inland. One examples of many of the newer European techniques that were used was the idea of the cable-stayed bridges.

Australia developed around coastal communities with rudimentary road systems to inland settlements. The early years saw early bridge technology limited very much to the 18th-century European technology of masonry arches and cast iron, the latter still in its infancy and not produced to any great extent in New South Wales.

NSW at the time of early settlement had an abundance of convict labour and had a need for rapid construction. In a country heavily timbered this led to basic timber structure bridges but as the colony gained stability, the government looked towards more permanent structures. Furthermore, as the skills for quarrying and stone dressing became available, masonry bridges began to be designed and built. As all metal materials had to be imported, iron bridges were rarely appropriate and were in any case still too novel for colonial application. Iron bridges were only used for major crossings on important corridors.

Timber truss bridges, and timber bridges generally were so common that NSW was known to travellers as the "timber bridge state".

The following list illustrates the development of New South Wales bridge construction techniques. The list commences from the earlier constructions through to the later developments.

New South Wales historic bridges
Sorted by date

19th century

20th century

Allan type truss
The Allan truss bridge is named after Percy Allan, a famous Australian engineer who designed this bridge type. His design consisted of vertical and diagonal arrangements comprising a combination of timber and iron elements. The timber elements were designed to be in compression and the iron elements in tension. Allen's design followed extensive testing of Australian hardwoods by Prof. Warren and his early engineering students at Sydney University. The timber used was mostly ironbark because of its high strength. Other features of Allan's truss design included design to minimize later maintenance and/or replacement of elements. For this reason the trusses were built in pairs to facilitate work on a particular element without requiring the whole bridge to be supported, as was the case with previous timber designs. Allan's design was very cost-effective.

The Hampden Bridge in New South Wales Australia was the first of a larger style bridge to be built on Percy Allan’s design with the Tharwa Bridge  pre-dating it.

Dare type truss
Harvey Dare was a leading engineer in the Public Works Department, and a prominent figure in early 20th century NSW. He was a designer of bridges and he developed the Dare Truss which was similar to the Allan truss but contained improvements which made them stronger and easier to maintain. This engineering enhancement represents a significant evolution of the design of timber truss bridges, and gives Dare trusses some technical significance. Dare Trusses were the fifth of the five stages of evolution of timber truss road bridges in NSW.

In 1998 there were 27 surviving Dare trusses in NSW of the 40 built, and 82 timber truss road bridges survive from the over 400 built.

See also 

 List of bridges in Australia

References

 
New South Wales-related lists
History of transport in New South Wales
New South Wales